Sijiaoting is a railway station on the Taiwan Railways Administration Yilan line. It is located in Ruifang District, New Taipei, Taiwan.

History
The station was opened on 5 May 1919.

See also
 List of railway stations in Taiwan

References

1919 establishments in Taiwan
Railway stations in New Taipei
Railway stations opened in 1919
Railway stations served by Taiwan Railways Administration